Câlnic or Calnic may refer to several places in Romania:

 Câlnic, Alba, a commune in Alba County
 Câlnic, Gorj, a commune in Gorj County
 Câlnic, a district in the city of Reșița, Caraș-Severin County
 Calnic, a village in Valea Crișului Commune, Covasna County
 Câlnic (Secaș), a river in Alba County
 Câlnic (Gilort), a river in Gorj County
 Câlnic, a tributary of the Tismana in Gorj County